Después del silencio (After the silence) is a 1956 Argentinian movie filmed in black and white directed by Lucas Demare on the script by Sixto Pondal Ríos whose main characters were Arturo García Buhr, María Rosa Gallo, Guillermo Battaglia and Mario Passano, which premiered on 13 September 1956. It is a film classified as a pamphleteer that while filming was called Aurora of freedom (Aurora de libertad). It was the last film in which Gloria Bayardo intervened.

Production
The film was made in early 1956, and premiered as part of the celebrations for the first anniversary of the coup, which overthrew the government of Juan Domingo Perón. It was part of a group of films related to the new government regime.

Synopsis
In the mid-1950s a doctor who must attend a detainee by the police who has been tortured begins to be prosecuted. It is freely inspired in the case of student Ernesto Mario Bravo.

Cast
  Arturo García Buhr …Dr. Anselmo Demarco
  María Rosa Gallo …Laura
  Guillermo Battaglia …Pablo Garrido
  Mario Passano …Jacinto Godoy
  Morenita Galé ...Amante de Garrido
  Enrique Fava …Comisario Portela
  Pedro Laxalt …Comisario Blanco
  Blanca Tapia …Beatriz
  Gloria Bayardo …Directora de escuela
  Raúl del Valle…Giordano
  Josefa Goldar …Sra. Godoy
  Violeta Antier ...Srta. Daneri
  Domingo Mania …Inspector de escuelas
  Orestes Soriani …Juez
  Enrique Borrás
  Miguel Dante
  Julio Bianquet …Policía 1
  Tito Grassi
  Aurelia Ferrer …Benita
  Romualdo Quiroga …Torturador
  Warly Ceriani …Médico
  Stella Maris Closas …Kuky
  Rogelio Romano
  Francisco Audenino
  Jorge Villoldo …Delegado
  Lucía Barause …Detenida
  Mercedes Llambí
  Domingo Garibotto …Detenido
  Fernando Campos
  Eduardo Humberto Nóbili …Secretario de Garrido
  Jorge Aries
  Laura Saniez …Enfermera 1
  Teresa Blasco …Enfermera 2
  Roberto Bordoni
  Luis de Lucía
  Alfredo Santa Cruz
  Rafael Diserio …Policía 2
  Mónica Linares
  Eduardo Primo
  Carlos A. Tapia
  Jacinto Curtis
  Luis Odierna
  Jorge Hilton …Extra

External links
 

1956 films
1950s Spanish-language films
Argentine black-and-white films
Films directed by Lucas Demare
Argentine drama films
1956 drama films